Benjamin Reed (born 2 October 1961) is a retired South African football (soccer) midfielder who played for Bloemfontein Celtic his whole career. He is the all-time top goalscorer for Bloemfontein Celtic with 75 goals.

References

1961 births
Living people
Association football forwards
South African soccer players
Bloemfontein Celtic F.C. players